Ethiopia Adventist College (EAC) is a private Christian co-educational college located on 182 hectares some 234 kilometers southeast of Addis Ababa in West Arsi Zone of Oromia Regional State in Ethiopia. It is owned and run by the Seventh-day Adventist Church and is part of the Seventh-day Adventist education system, the world's second largest Christian school system.

References

1947 establishments in Ethiopia
Christian schools in Ethiopia
Universities and colleges affiliated with the Seventh-day Adventist Church
Educational institutions established in 1947